Euphorbia paralias, the sea spurge, is a species of flowering plant in the family Euphorbiaceae, native to Europe, northern Africa and western Asia.

The species is  widely naturalised in Australia. It invades coastal areas, displacing local species and colonising open sand areas favoured by certain nesting birds.  Major eradication programmes have been undertaken in some areas, for example by Sea Spurge Remote Area Teams in Tasmania, with great success.

Description
The plant has many stems, dividing into 3–5 fertile branches, each branching further. Leaves on fertile branches are circular-rhombic or reniform. Flower head on a solitary cyathia, found in upper forks or at the apex, surrounded by bell-shaped bracts. Female flowers are with styles that divide into two short stigmas, flowering September–May. Fruit is a capsule flattened from above or nearly spherical, deep furrows, wrinkled on keels. Seeds ovoid, pale-grey and smooth. There is a kidney-shaped fleshy outgrowth from the seed coat.

References

paralias
Flora of Lebanon
Plants described in 1753
Taxa named by Carl Linnaeus
Flora of Malta
Flora of the Mediterranean Basin
Invasive plant species in Australia